This is a list of 306 species in the genus Apocephalus, ant-decapitating flies.

Apocephalus species

Apocephalus absentis Brown, 1993
Apocephalus acanthus Brown, 2000
Apocephalus aculeatus Borgmeier, 1925
Apocephalus adustus  Brown, 1993
Apocephalus aequalis Brown, 2002
Apocephalus albiapex Brown, 2002
Apocephalus altapivorus Brown, 1996
Apocephalus altus Brown, 2002
Apocephalus amacayacuensis Brown, 2014
Apocephalus amati Brown, 2014
Apocephalus amenti Brown, 2014
Apocephalus amorimi Brown, 2014
Apocephalus amplexus Brown, 2002
Apocephalus amplidiscus Brown, 2000
Apocephalus anacurvus Brown, 2002
Apocephalus analis Borgmeier, 1958
Apocephalus ancylus Brown, 1997
Apocephalus anfractus  Brown, 1993
Apocephalus angularis Borgmeier, 1971
Apocephalus angusticauda Brown, 1997
Apocephalus angustinervis Borgmeier, 1961
Apocephalus angustistylus  Brown, 1993
Apocephalus annulatus Brown, 2000
Apocephalus antennatus Malloch, 1913
Apocephalus apivorus Brown, 1996
Apocephalus aquilonius Brown, 2002
Apocephalus arachnes Brown, 2002
Apocephalus aridus Malloch, 1912
Apocephalus astrictus Brown, 2002
Apocephalus asymmetricus Brown, 1997
Apocephalus asyndetus Brown, 2000
Apocephalus atavus Brown, 1996
Apocephalus atrimarginatus Brown, 2000
Apocephalus attophilus Borgmeier, 1928
Apocephalus aztecae Borgmeier, 1961
Apocephalus barbarus Brown, 2002
Apocephalus barbicauda Borgmeier, 1931
Apocephalus barbiventris Brown, 2000
Apocephalus batillus Brown, 2000
Apocephalus bilineatus Brown, 2014
Apocephalus bilobus Brown, 1997
Apocephalus bisetus  Brown, 1993
Apocephalus bispinosus Borgmeier, 1928
Apocephalus borealis Brues, 1924 
Apocephalus brevicercus  Brown, 1993
Apocephalus brevicosta Borgmeier, 1958
Apocephalus brevifrons Brown, 2000
Apocephalus brevitergum Brown, 2002
Apocephalus brochus Brown, 2000
Apocephalus brunnipes  Brown, 1993
Apocephalus bulbosus Brown, 2002
Apocephalus camarae Brown, 2014
Apocephalus camponoti Borgmeier, 1925
Apocephalus cantleyi Brown, 1997
Apocephalus carcinus Brown, 2002
Apocephalus cardiacus Brown, 2000
Apocephalus catholicus Brown, 2000
Apocephalus caudatarius (Schmitz, 1915)
Apocephalus cinereus Brown, 2002
Apocephalus cingulatus Borgmeier, 1961
Apocephalus clarilocus Brown, 2002
Apocephalus clavicauda Brown, 1997
Apocephalus codonus Corona & Brown, 2004
Apocephalus collatus Brown, 2002
Apocephalus colobus Brown, 1997
Apocephalus colombicus Brown, 1997
Apocephalus comatus Borgmeier, 1958
Apocephalus commensuratus Brown, 2002
Apocephalus comosus Brown, 2000
Apocephalus completus Brown, 1997
Apocephalus concavus Brown, 1997
Apocephalus concisus Brown, 2002
Apocephalus conecitonis Brown, 2000
Apocephalus conformalis Brown, 2000
Apocephalus constrictus Brown, 2000
Apocephalus contortiventris Brown, 2000
Apocephalus contracticauda Brown, 2000
Apocephalus coquilletti Malloch, 1912
Apocephalus crassilatus Brown, 2000
Apocephalus crassus Brown, 1996
Apocephalus criniventris Brown, 2014
Apocephalus crucicauda Borgmeier, 1928
Apocephalus ctenicoxa Brown, 2002
Apocephalus cultellatus Borgmeier, 1961
Apocephalus cuneatus Borgmeier, 1958
Apocephalus curtinotus Brown, 2000
Apocephalus curtus  Brown, 1993
Apocephalus curvipes Borgmeier, 1958
Apocephalus cyathus Brown, 2002
Apocephalus cyclodiscus Brown, 2000
Apocephalus deceptus Brown, 2000
Apocephalus decurvus Brown, 1997
Apocephalus denotatus Brown, 2000
Apocephalus densepilosus Borgmeier, 1971
Apocephalus dichocercus Borgmeier, 1958
Apocephalus dichromatus Brown, 1997
Apocephalus diffusus Brown, 1997
Apocephalus digitalis Borgmeier, 1971
Apocephalus dinoponerae Brown, 2000
Apocephalus disparicauda Borgmeier, 1962
Apocephalus divergens Borgmeier, 1971
Apocephalus dracodermus Brown, 2000
Apocephalus dubitatus Borgmeier, 1971
Apocephalus echinatus Brown, 1996
Apocephalus ecitonis Borgmeier, 1928
Apocephalus emargilatus Brown, 2000
Apocephalus emphysemus Brown, 1996
Apocephalus epicautus Brown, 2002
Apocephalus euryacanthus Brown, 2014
Apocephalus eurydomus Brown, 2000
Apocephalus euryterminus Brown, 2002
Apocephalus extraneus Brown, 1997
Apocephalus facettalis Borgmeier, 1961
Apocephalus facis Brown, 1997
Apocephalus feeneri Disney, 1982
Apocephalus fenestratus Brown, 2000
Apocephalus fernandezi Brown, 2002
Apocephalus flexiseta Brown, 2002
Apocephalus flexus Brown, 2000
Apocephalus frameatus Brown, 2002
Apocephalus funditus Brown, 2000
Apocephalus fusciapex Brown, 2002
Apocephalus fuscipalpis Borgmeier, 1958
Apocephalus gemellus Borgmeier, 1963
Apocephalus gemursus  Brown, 1993
Apocephalus gigantivorus Brown, 2000
Apocephalus glabriventris Brown, 2000
Apocephalus globosus Brown, 2000
Apocephalus glomerosus Brown, 2002
Apocephalus gonzalezae Brown, 2014
Apocephalus gracilis  Brown, 1993
Apocephalus grandiflavus Brown, 1994
Apocephalus grandipalpis Borgmeier, 1925
Apocephalus guapilensis Brown, 1997
Apocephalus hansoni  Brown, 1993
Apocephalus hibbsi Brown, 1997
Apocephalus hippurus Brown, 2002
Apocephalus hirsutus Brown, 1997
Apocephalus hirtifrons Peterson & Robinson, 1976
Apocephalus hispidus Borgmeier, 1958
Apocephalus holdenae Brown, 2014
Apocephalus horridus Borgmeier, 1963
Apocephalus hystricosus Brown, 2002
Apocephalus inaffectus Brown, 2002
Apocephalus incomptus Brown, 2000
Apocephalus indeptus Brown, 2000
Apocephalus indistinctus Brown, 2000
Apocephalus infradentatus Borgmeier, 1961
Apocephalus infraspinosus Borgmeier, 1961
Apocephalus inimicus Borgmeier, 1961
Apocephalus inpalpabilis Brown, 2000
Apocephalus insignis Borgmeier, 1961
Apocephalus insolitus Borgmeier, 1967
Apocephalus insulanus Borgmeier, 1969
Apocephalus intonsus Brown, 2000
Apocephalus kungae Brown, 2000
Apocephalus laceyi Disney, 1981
Apocephalus lamellatus Borgmeier, 1971
Apocephalus lanceatus Borgmeier, 1925
Apocephalus laselvaensis Brown, 1997
Apocephalus latiapex Brown, 2002
Apocephalus laticauda Borgmeier, 1958
Apocephalus latinsulosus Brown, 2000
Apocephalus lativentris Brown, 1997
Apocephalus lemniscus Brown, 1996
Apocephalus leptotarsus  Brown, 1993
Apocephalus limai Prado, 1976
Apocephalus lizanoi Brown, 1996
Apocephalus lobicauda Brown, 2000
Apocephalus longimanus Brown, 2012
Apocephalus longimucrus Brown, 2012
Apocephalus longipes Borgmeier, 1958
Apocephalus longistylus  Brown, 1993
Apocephalus lunatus Brown, 1997
Apocephalus luteihalteratus Borgmeier, 1923
Apocephalus lyratus Borgmeier, 1971
Apocephalus maculicauda Borgmeier, 1961
Apocephalus maculosus Brown, 2000
Apocephalus magnicauda Brown, 2000
Apocephalus malignus Disney & Michailovskaya, 2002
Apocephalus marginatus Borgmeier, 1925
Apocephalus marinhoi Brown, 2014
Apocephalus medius Brown, 2002
Apocephalus megalops Brown, 1996
Apocephalus melinus Brown, 2000
Apocephalus meniscus Brown, 2000
Apocephalus mesacanthus Brown & LeBrun, 2010
Apocephalus mexacanthus Brown, 2014
Apocephalus mexicanus Borgmeier, 1969
Apocephalus micrepelis  Brown, 1993
Apocephalus minutus Borgmeier, 1958
Apocephalus miricauda Borgmeier, 1971
Apocephalus missouriensis Brown, 2012
Apocephalus modesta Borgmeier, 1963
Apocephalus moraviensis  Brown, 1993
Apocephalus mortifer Borgmeier, 1937
Apocephalus mucronatus Borgmeier, 1958
Apocephalus neivai Borgmeier, 1931
Apocephalus niger Malloch, 1935
Apocephalus nigricauda Brown, 1997
Apocephalus nitifrons Brown, 1994
Apocephalus niveus Brown, 1996
Apocephalus normenti Prado, 1976
Apocephalus oblongus Brown, 1997
Apocephalus obscurus Borgmeier, 1923
Apocephalus occidentalis Brown, 1997
Apocephalus octonus Brown, 1997
Apocephalus onorei Brown, 1997
Apocephalus opimus Brown, 2002
Apocephalus orbiculus Brown, 2000
Apocephalus pachycondylae Brown, 2000
Apocephalus paldiae Brown, 2000
Apocephalus palposus Borgmeier, 1963
Apocephalus papei Brown, 2014
Apocephalus paracanthus Brown, 2014
Apocephalus parallelus Brown, 1997
Apocephalus paraponerae Borgmeier, 1958
Apocephalus parvifurcatus Enderlein, 1912
Apocephalus parvus Disney, 2007
Apocephalus patulus Brown, 1997
Apocephalus paulus Borgmeier, 1963
Apocephalus peniculatus Borgmeier, 1925
Apocephalus pergandei Coquillett, 1901
Apocephalus persecutor Borgmeier, 1961
Apocephalus petiolus Brown, 2000
Apocephalus pilatus Brown, 1996
Apocephalus piliventris Borgmeier, 1925
Apocephalus pittadearaujoi Brown, 2014
Apocephalus planus Brown, 2002
Apocephalus platycauda Brown, 2002
Apocephalus platypalpis Borgmeier, 1925
Apocephalus pluteus Brown, 2002
Apocephalus ponderosus Brown, 2002
Apocephalus praedator Borgmeier, 1971
Apocephalus pristinus  Brown, 1993
Apocephalus prolatus  Brown, 1993
Apocephalus prolixus Brown, 1996
Apocephalus pseudocercus Brown, 1997
Apocephalus quadratus Brown, 1997
Apocephalus quadriglumis Borgmeier, 1961
Apocephalus radiatus Brown, 2002
Apocephalus reburrus Brown, 2002
Apocephalus rectisetus Brown, 2014
Apocephalus reticulatus Brown, 2000
Apocephalus riccardae Brown, 2014
Apocephalus rionegrensis Borgmeier, 1928
Apocephalus ritualis Brown, 1997
Apocephalus roeschardae Brown, 2000
Apocephalus rotundus Brown, 2002
Apocephalus rudiculus Brown, 1997
Apocephalus rugosus Brown, 2002
Apocephalus sagittarius Borgmeier, 1971
Apocephalus satanus Brown, 1994
Apocephalus scaurus Corona & Brown, 2004
Apocephalus secundus Brown, 1996
Apocephalus securis Brown, 1997
Apocephalus secus Brown, 2000
Apocephalus setialvus  Brown, 1993
Apocephalus setilobus Brown, 1997
Apocephalus setimargo Borgmeier, 1971
Apocephalus setissitergus Brown, 2012
Apocephalus setitarsus Brown, 1997
Apocephalus setiventris Borgmeier, 1971
Apocephalus sharkeyi Brown, 2002
Apocephalus silvestrii Borgmeier, 1971
Apocephalus similis Malloch, 1912
Apocephalus sincerus Brown, 2002
Apocephalus singulus Brown, 1997
Apocephalus sinuosus Brown, 1997
Apocephalus spatulatus Borgmeier, 1958
Apocephalus spatulicauda Borgmeier, 1961
Apocephalus spiculus Brown, 2000
Apocephalus spinilatus Brown, 1997
Apocephalus spinosus Brown, 1997
Apocephalus staurotus Brown, 2002
Apocephalus stillatus Brown, 1997
Apocephalus strazhnikae Brown, 2014
Apocephalus strazhnikae Brown, 2014
Apocephalus striativentris Brown, 2000
Apocephalus striatus Brown, 1997
Apocephalus strongylus Brown, 2000
Apocephalus succineus Brown, 2000
Apocephalus sulcatus Borgmeier, 1963
Apocephalus superatus Brown, 2002
Apocephalus tanyurus Brown, 2000
Apocephalus tenuipes Borgmeier, 1963
Apocephalus tenuitarsus Brown, 1997
Apocephalus torulus Brown, 2000
Apocephalus triangularis Brown, 2000
Apocephalus trichocoxa Borgmeier, 1925
Apocephalus tricuspis Borgmeier, 1961
Apocephalus trifidus Brown, 2000
Apocephalus trisetus  Brown, 1993
Apocephalus tritarsus  Brown, 1993
Apocephalus truncaticercus  Brown, 1993
Apocephalus unitarsus  Brown, 1993
Apocephalus vangus Brown, 2002
Apocephalus vannus Brown, 1997
Apocephalus velutinus Borgmeier, 1958
Apocephalus vibrissicauda Brown, 1997
Apocephalus vicinus Borgmeier, 1925
Apocephalus vicosae Disney & Braganca, 2000
Apocephalus wallerae Disney & Braganca, 2000
Apocephalus weissi  Brown, 2012
Apocephalus wheeleri Brues, 1903
Apocephalus wirthi Borgmeier, 1963
Apocephalus xavierfilhoi Brown, 2014

References

Apocephalus
Articles created by Qbugbot